Blattner is a surname of German origin. It may refer to:

Buddy Blattner (1920–2009), table tennis and baseball player
Frank Blattner (1890–1954), baseball player
Robert James Blattner (1931–2015), mathematician
Ludwig Blattner (1881-1935), German-British inventor, film producer and studio owner
Gerry Blattner (1913-circa 1992), British film producer

German-language surnames